The 13th Cinemalaya Independent Film Festival was held from August 4–13, 2017 in Metro Manila, Philippines. A total of nine full-length features and twelve short films competed. The festival was opened by Mikhail Red's Birdshot and was closed by Adolfo Alix, Jr.'s Pastor.

Entries
The winning film is highlighted with boldface and a dagger.

Full-Length Features

Short films

Awards
The awards ceremony was held on August 13, 2017 at the Tanghalang Nicanor Abelardo, Cultural Center of the Philippines.

Full-Length Features
 Best Film – Respeto by Treb Monteras II
 Special Jury Prize – Baconaua by Joseph Israel Laban
 Audience Choice Award – Respeto by Treb Monteras II
 Best Direction – Joseph Israel Laban for Baconaua
 Best Actor – Noel Comia Jr. for Kiko Boksingero
 Best Actress – Angeli Bayani for Bagahe
 Best Supporting Actor –  Dido de la Paz for Respeto
 Best Supporting Actress – Yayo Aguila for Kiko Boksingero
 Best Screenplay – Zig Dulay for Bagahe
 Best Cinematography – 
Ike Avellana for Respeto
T.M. Malones for Baconaua
 Best Editing – Lawrence Ang for Respeto
 Best Sound – Corinne de San Jose for Respeto
 Best Original Music Score – Pepe Manikan for Kiko Boksingero
 Best Production Design – Marxie Maolen Fadul for Nabubulok
 NETPAC Award – Respeto by Treb Monteras II

Short films
 Best Short Film – Hilom by P.R. Patindol
 Special Jury Prize – Fatima Marie Torres and the Invasion of Space Shuttle Pinas 25 by Carlo Francisco Manatad
 Audience Choice Award – Nakauwi Na by Marvin Cabangunay and Jaynus Olaivar
 Best Direction – E. del Mundo for Manong ng Pa-Aling
 Best Screenplay – Duwi Monteagudo (aka Joseph Israel Laban) for Bawod
 NETPAC Award –  Aliens Ata by Glenn Barit

References

External links
Cinemalaya Independent Film Festival

Cinemalaya Independent Film Festival
Cine
Cine
2017 in Philippine cinema